The Najiaying Mosque is a mosque in Tonghai County, Yuxi City, Yunnan Province, China.

History
The mosque was originally built in 1370. Over the past 600 years, the mosque had been expanded several times. In 2001, a new mosque building was constructed.

Architecture
The new mosque building consists of five floors, four minarets and one dome. According to the local mountain establishment. The hall occupies an area of 10,000 m2. The towers are 72.4 meters in height. The second floor can accommodate 3,000 worshipers. The old building uses a traditional Chinese style, and since has been used as a mosque for women which can hold up to 800 worshipers.

See also
 Islam in China
 List of mosques in China

References

Mosques completed in 2001
Mosques in Yunnan
Buildings and structures in Yuxi
Mosques completed in 1370
Tonghai County